Lowing is a Scottish surname, and may refer to:

 Gavin Lowing (born 1973), Australian Engineer
 Alan Lowing (born 1988), Scottish footballer
 David Lowing (born 1983), Scottish footballer
 Larissa Lowing (born 1973), Canadian artistic gymnast